WSL may refer to:

Computing
 Wide-spectrum language, a kind of programming language
 Windows Subsystem for Linux, a part of Microsoft Windows 10 and Windows 11 which allows the installation of Linux distributions.

Organisations
 Swiss Federal Institute for Forest, Snow and Landscape Research (Eidgenössische Forschungsanstalt für Wald, Schnee und Landschaft, WSL)
 White Star Line, a shipping company, owner of the RMS Titanic
 Workers' Socialist League, a UK Trotskyist party

Sport
 Women's Super League - an English professional league for women's association football clubs
 RFL Women's Super League , the top-level women's rugby league league in England
 Women's Super League (basketball), Ireland 
 World Series Lights, a motor racing competition
 World Surf League, a global professional competitive surfing league founded in 1976
 Wrestling Superstars Live, a defunct wrestling promotion

Other uses
 Weatherscan Local, the former name of 24-hour weather channel Weatherscan
 Woluwe-Saint-Lambert, a district of Brussels